Lee Ryan is the debut and only solo studio album to be released by Blue band-member and singer, Lee Ryan. The album was the first to be released from the millionaire contract that the singer made with the label Sony BMG and from it 4 singles were released, all of them appearing on charts in Europe. The album was moderately successful and reached silver and gold records in the UK and Italy, respectively.

Background and production
At the end of February 2005 Lee Ryan was diagnosed with nodules on his throat, causing the cancellation of the farewell tour of Blue. The tour was scheduled to start on 11 of March. With no further plans with the band, all members decided to focus on their solo projects. According to the spokesperson of the band this was "not the end" and "they're taking a break, but they haven't officially split". Ryan revealed on ITV2 documentary The Big Reunion that soon after, he was approached by record executives to pursue a solo career. He signed a $1.1 million record deal with Sony BMG and was looked after by music chief Hugh Goldsmith to help him produce and write his debut album. The record label had high hopes for his career, hoping that he would become the new Robbie Williams. Lee Ryan admitted that there were parallels between himself and the former Take That star, but is reluctant to encourage the comparison. He said: "Aside from making a similar career change, I don't want to be compared too heavily with Robbie's style - but I do admire him for his success as a solo artist." According to an interview with Craig McLean, Ryan wrote a lot of tracks for the album, enough to fill half of his second album as well. He mainly worked with Ash Howes and Martin Harrington, who had already worked with Natalie Imbruglia and Dido, while had recently produced Kylie Minogue's hit single Love at First Sight. Lee Ryan wanted to collaborate with Kylie Minogue, hoping she would sing backing vocals on a track. His plans unfortunately never materialised. Army of Lovers was chosen as the first single of the album. Dolce & Gabbana also signed Ryan up to be the face of their new line of clothing in the United Kingdom. Ryan did not receive any money for the deal, he was just going to be provided with many new clothes and he should wear at least one piece of Dolce & Gabbana when promoting the album or performing live.

Release and promotion 
The album was released on 1 August 2005, debuting at #6 on the UK Albums Chart which was its peak position. It remained inside the top 75 for another three weeks before disappearing from the chart completely.  The album was also released in Europe to moderate success. It managed thought to reach #3 in Italy. Ryan did several appearances to European television channels in order to promote his album, including an appearance in TVP2, where he sang an unplugged version of "In the Morning" and Italy where he sang the Italian version of the first single Army of Lovers "Ho Te". Shortly after the release of the album Ryan released his second single, Turn Your Car Around, which was also moderately successful, doing no boost to the album sales, which remained outside the top 75 in the UK. January 2006 saw the release of the album's third single When I Think of You, which peaked at #15 on the UK Singles Chart and while it succeed in promoting the album's sales a bit, as the album re-entered the UK Albums Chart for four more weeks, it became Ryan's last release from the album in the United Kingdom.

The album's fourth single, Real Love, was not released in the United Kingdom due to poor sales of the album and its former singles, however, the song was released across Europe and was used as the theme to the film Ice Age: The Meltdown. Ryan also secured a vocal role in the British version of the film. The song received additional production from Brian Rawling and Paul Meehanfor its release as a single.

Because of the album poor sales Ryan was later dropped from his record label.

Singles
Army of Lovers was the first single from the album, released on 18 July 2005. The single peaked at #3 on the UK Singles Chart, but found higher success staying at #1 for four weeks in Italy. The physical single featured an acoustic version of the song, an album sampler featuring samples of "When I Think of You", "Parking" and "Jump" and the music video.

The second singe released from the album was Turn Your Car Around on 10 October 2005. The single peaked at #12 on the UK Singles Chart, but found higher success peaking at #2 in Italy and reaching #1 in the European Top 20. The physical single featured three b-sides: "Best of You (BBC Radio 1 Live Lounge)", "These Words (Gold Horizons)" and "Movin' On", as well as the music video. The Italian version of the single also included the song "Ho Te", the Italian version of the first single Army of Lovers.

"When I Think of You" was the third song to be released as single from the album on 30 January 2006. The single peaked at #15 on the UK Singles Chart, before dropping out of the top forty the following week. The physical single featured a new B-side called "I Can Let Go Now".

A final single was released from the album, which also served as the lead single from the film soundtrack Ice Age: The Meltdown. The song Real Love received additional production from Brian Rawling and Paul Meehanfor, being released on 7 April 2006. The single was not released in the UK due to the low sales of the album and the mediocre sales of the previous singles, however it found success in Italy and Australia. The single also featured a club remix by the Sharp Boys.

Critical reception 

The critical reception of the album was mixed to negative. Jon O'Brien from AllMusic gave the album 3,5 out of 5 stars, stating that "Ryan has produced a surprisingly sophisticated and authentic debut". He also gave credit to his vocal abilities while recognising his "undeniable talents". Michael Hubbard from MusicOMH found that Lee Ryan's debut album "showcases vocal prowess" but he thought that the songs "are a mixed bag of made-to-order drivetime ditties and flaccid shelf filler".

Bine Jankowski of Laut.de gave 2 out of 5 stars, commenting that the album was extremely mainstream, ideal for dentist's waiting rooms and lifts. Caroline Sullivan commented on Lee Ryan's debut album as a disappointment, while reviewing Simon Webbe's Sanctuary on The Guardian.

Track listing

Notes
 signifies a co-producer
 signifies a remixer

Charts

Certifications and sales

References

2005 debut albums
Lee Ryan albums
Albums produced by Cutfather
Pop rock albums by English artists